The 1983–84 season was Port Vale's 72nd season of football in the English Football League, and first (15th overall) back in the Third Division following their promotion from the Fourth Division. The club suffered a horrendous start, and John McGrath lost his job before Christmas; he was replaced by his assistant John Rudge. Rudge instigated an immense turnaround in results, but Vale still ended up relegated, six points shy of safety. Ireland international Eamonn O'Keefe was top-scorer and Player of the Year, and young Mark Bright showed his potential, though left at the end of the season.

Overview

Third Division
The pre-season saw John McGrath pay Wigan Athletic £10,000 for Ireland international Eamonn O'Keefe. He also brought in three players on free transfers: Tommy Gore (Bury), Gary Pollard (Chesterfield), and Chris Pearce (Rochdale). The club reported record season ticket sales, however several players refused to sign new contracts. As a result, Barry Siddall, Russell Bromage, Geoff Hunter, and Terry Armstrong remained on weekly contracts.

The season began with McGrath's new attacking tactics failing miserably, despite a 2–0 win over Bristol Rovers in the fourth game of the programme. Fifteen league games without a win followed, keeping the club rooted at the foot of the table. The Sentinel'''s Chris Harper commented that "Vale cannot go on being applauded off the park as entertaining losers." Phil Sproson noted that the ongoing contract problems caused unrest in the camp. Siddall handed in his notice, whilst Bob Newton and £8,000 were traded to Chesterfield for the services of Martin Henderson. Bromage walked out on the club after they refused to give him a contract lasting beyond two years. On 31 October, McGrath had to use 41-year-old coach Alan Oakes in a 1–0 defeat to Plymouth Argyle. Chairman Jim Lloyd then blocked McGrath's attempt to sign defender Ken Fogarty, showing how little confidence the board had in their manager. McGrath complained in the media, only to be 'gagged', instructed only to speak to the media on team affairs. Supporters began organizing demonstrations against Lloyd, and in favour of McGrath. In November Siddall and Bromage returned to sign new contracts. Steve Fox was suspended by the club for a fortnight after he refused to play in defence, and on 26 November Burnley thrashed Vale 7–0 at Turf Moor in front of Granada TV cameras. Starting December nine points adrift of safety, paying the third-highest wage bill in the division (£9,000 a week), and home gate receipts down to around £3,000, McGrath was suspended on full pay. The club received a flood of letters in protest, 'some just abusive', but McGrath left permanently after being compensated financially.

John Rudge was appointed caretaker-manager, and made his first signing by taking midfielder Kevin Young on loan from Burnley. His side were defeated 4–0 at Deepdale by Preston North End, and finished the game with just nine men. By now thirteen points short of safety, and seven points from their nearest competitors, The Sentinel's Chris Harper believed them to be 'the poorest side in the Third Division by quite a long chalk'. The revival started the next day, with a 2–0 win over Sheffield United the first of four straight home wins that cut the gap to safety down to only four points. O'Keefe and Henderson formed a potent striking partnership, whilst Young added balance to the midfield. Jim Steel was sold off to Wrexham for £10,000. Rudge said the battle to avoid relegation was as difficult a job as 'trying to climb Everest in a pair of pumps'. Struggling again in February, their 4–2 win over Newport County lifted them off the bottom spot. Following a 4–3 win over Brentford on 3 March, Rudge was appointed as manager until the end of the season. He took Millwall's Andy Massey on loan, but failed to re-sign Bob Newton. On 19 March, Vale defeated fellow strugglers Southend United 2–1 at Roots Hall, their first away game of the league campaign, it took them out of the relegation zone. The job only got more difficult for Rudge however, as an injury crisis developed, and the team went nine games with just one victory. Young striker Mark Bright scored five times in the final six games, yet relegation was all but confirmed despite a 1–0 win over promotion-chasing Hull City. Just 2,299 turned up at Vale Park for a final day 1–0 victory over Millwall, yet a pitch invasion still ensued, with the invaders chanting "We'll be back".

They finished in 23rd place, ahead only of Exeter City. Only Exeter and Wigan Athletic scored fewer, and only Exeter conceded more goals. Player of the Year Eamonn O'Keefe was top-scorer with eleven goals, yet it was Mark Bright who was a revelation.

Finances
On the financial side, a £50,601 profit was recorded with donations from the Development Fund of £146,177 and an income of £73,023 from the open market rents. Wages had been cut back to £310,542, whilst gate receipts rose to £180,504. The club's shirt sponsors were PMT. Steve Fox left for Chester City and Gary Pollard joined Mansfield Town. However Mark Bright signed with Leicester City against Rudge's wishes, and a tribunal handed Vale £33,333 and top-up clauses. O'Keefe also requested a transfer, as he felt he would receive no further international caps playing in the fourth tier. Mick Cullerton, then Vale's commercial manager, later claimed that vast wage disparities in the squad caused discontent and reduced club morale.

Cup competitions
In the FA Cup, Vale were eliminated at the First Round by Lincoln City.

In the League Cup, Vale 'ran riot' over Wrexham at the Racecourse Ground to go through to the Second Round 8–2 on aggregate. Coming up against Ron Atkinson's Manchester United, they were defeated 1–0 at home despite 'a workmanlike performance', and beaten 2–0 at Old Trafford in a 'credible' game. The home leg in Burslem saw a crowd of 19,855 – the highest crowd since the visit of West Ham United in 1973. This raised £45,873 in gate receipts for the club. However a fifty-strong gang of Manchester thugs caused chaos in Burslem town centre, stabbing a man from Brown Edge.

In the Associate Members' Cup, Vale beat Fourth Division Hereford United 1–0 at Edgar Street. They were then beaten 2–0 at the Memorial Stadium by Bristol Rovers.

League table

ResultsPort Vale's score comes first''

Football League Third Division

Results by matchday

Matches

FA Cup

League Cup

Associate Members' Cup

Player statistics

Appearances

Top scorers

Transfers

Transfers in

Transfers out

Loans in

Loans out

References
Specific

General

Port Vale F.C. seasons
Port Vale